The Porta Bohemica is a EuroCity (EC) international express train. Since December 2014 it is operating between Hamburg-Altona and Budapest Keleti.

From 1993 to 2003, a predecessor train of the same name ran between Prague, the capital of the Czech Republic, and a number of different termini in northern Germany.

Route

The train takes the route via Berlin Hbf, Dresden Hbf, Praha hl.n., Brno hl.n. and Bratislava hl.st.
A sister train named Jan Jesenius, composed of Hungarian and German rolling stock, is running two hours earlier from Budapest and two hours later from Hamburg.

History
In May 1993, there was a major reorganisation of the international train services through the Elbe valley.  It involved the introduction of four daily EuroCity expresses.  Two existing trains, the Hungaria (Budapest–Hamburg) and the Vindobona (Vienna–Berlin) were upgraded to become EuroCity services, a new train, the EC Comenius (Prague–Berlin), was added to the timetable, and the Porta Bohemica replaced another existing train, the Primator (Prague–Berlin).  All of these changes took effect from 23 May 1993.

Initially, the Porta Bohemica ran between Praha-Holešovice in Prague and Hamburg-Altona in Hamburg.  The northbound train, EC 176, was the last of the four daily northbound Elbe valley EuroCity services to leave Prague, in the early afternoon.  The southbound train, EC 177, left Hamburg shortly after 08:00.

On 27 May 1995, the northern terminus of the Porta Bohemica was moved south, to Nauen, Germany (on the northwestern outskirts of Berlin), and the southern terminus in Prague was switched from Praha-Holešovice to Praha hl.n..  On 24 May 1998, the northern terminus was moved back to Hamburg, and in 2001 it was moved even further north, to Westerland (Sylt), also in Germany.  At the end of the following year, in December 2002, it was moved yet again, back to Hamburg for the second time.

On 14 December 2003, all of the EuroCity trains running through the Elbe valley lost their names.  Trains EC 176/177 continued to run without names for three years until 10 December 2006.  But when the naming of the Elbe valley EuroCity trains was reintroduced, the name Porta Bohemica was not reused.

From 14 December 2014, a two-hourly clock-face schedule was introduced between Prague and Budapest, alternating with a railjet between Prague and Graz every other hour. This meant that the EC 172/173 Vindobona was replaced by the EC 172/173 Porta Bohemica Hamburg-Altona—Budapest Keleti. The connection in Praha to a Railjet via Wien Hauptbahnhof to Graz Hauptbahnhof and vice versa includes an hour of layover.

Formation (consist)
The train is currently hauled between Hamburg and Dresden by a DB Class 101 locomotive, between Dresden and Prague by a ČD class 371 locomotive and between Prague and Budapest by a ČD Class 380 locomotive. It is composed of rolling stock of the Czech Railways, one first class open coach Ampz143, one dining car WRmz815, five second class compartment coaches Bmz241/245. A German second class open coach Bpmbdz294 offers wheelchair space and bicycle transportation. Seasonally, another German second class open coach Bpmz294 without these special amenities is added.

Formation EC 172
Formation EC 173

See also

 History of rail transport in the Czech Republic
 History of rail transport in Germany
 List of EuroCity services
 List of named passenger trains of Europe

References

EuroCity
International named passenger trains
Named passenger trains of Germany
Named passenger trains of the Czech Republic
Named passenger trains of Slovakia
Named passenger trains of Hungary
Railway services introduced in 1993
Railway services discontinued in 2003
Railway services introduced in 2014